Ana Perez Box (born 29 December 1995) is a Spanish judoka. She won the silver medal in the women's 52 kg event at the 2021 World Judo Championships held in Budapest, Hungary.

She is the silver medallist of the 2019 Judo Grand Slam Ekaterinburg in the −52 kg category.

She won one of the bronze medals in the women's 52 kg event at the 2022 Mediterranean Games held in Oran, Algeria.

References

External links
 
 
 

1995 births
Living people
Spanish female judoka
People from Groesbeek
Judoka at the 2019 European Games
European Games competitors for Spain
Judoka at the 2020 Summer Olympics
Olympic judoka of Spain
Competitors at the 2018 Mediterranean Games
Competitors at the 2022 Mediterranean Games
Mediterranean Games bronze medalists for Spain
Mediterranean Games medalists in judo
21st-century Spanish women
Sportspeople from Gelderland